I Love Mekons (stylized I ♥ Mekons on the album cover; also referred to as I (Heart) Mekons) is an album by the British-American punk rock band the Mekons, released in 1993 on the Quarterstick and Touch and Go labels. It is a concept album consisting of twelve love songs.

Background
Before I Love Mekons was released, the Mekons had been engaged in two years of rancorous arguments with their record label at the time, Warner Bros. Records subsidiary Loud Records. As a result, the Mekons did not release any albums for two years after the release of Curse of the Mekons in 1991. Originally, Warner Bros. had refused to release I Love Mekons because they thought it was not good enough. After the Mekons parted ways with Loud Records, the album was released in 1993 on Quarterstick, a subsidiary of Touch and Go.

Reception

Melody Makers Dave Jennings described I Love Mekons as "simultaneously a brilliant, exhilarating pop record and an exploration of the assumptions behind other people’s pop records." Robert Christgau gave the album a B+ grade, describing it as "love songs, laid out casually across disc and lyric sheet--a country album without a happy ending."

End-of-year lists
Greg Kot ranked I Love Mekons as his 10th favorite album of 1993, and Mark LePage of the Montreal Gazette named it his 4th favorite album of the year.

Track listing
"Millionaire"          – 4:37
"Wicked Midnite"       – 3:51
"I Don't Know"         – 4:20
"Dear Sausage"         – 3:48
"All I Want"           – 3:49
"Special"              – 2:30
"St. Valentine's Day"  – 4:59
"I Love Apple"         – 3:26
"Love Letter"          – 4:18
"Honeymoon in Hell"    – 5:34
"Too Personal"         – 5:54
"Point of No Return"   – 3:00

References

Further reading

The Mekons albums
1993 albums
Quarterstick Records albums
Concept albums
Touch and Go Records albums